Tasek Gelugor is a town located in North Seberang Perai, Penang, Malaysia. Within its vicinity it is the town closest to the North–South Expressway. The expressway sign for the Ipoh-George Town link can be seen in this town.

There are also roads connecting to Padang Serai, Penaga, Lunas, Kepala Batas[Bertam] and Bukit Mertajam.

There is a river near here named Sungai Jarak (dark in color, full of pig waste and smelly from Kampung Selamat pig farm). Tasek Gelugor is near to Kedah border which is close to Kampung Selamat in Penang and Padang Serai in Kedah.

The Tasek Gelugor railway station serves residents here and in Padang Serai to travel to Bukit Mertajam and Sungai Petani.

Notable natives
 Mohamad Sabu, former Minister of Defence

References

North Seberang Perai District
Towns in Penang